MWUA may refer to:

 Multiplicative weight update algorithm
 Montana Water Use Act, see Montana Water Court